Igor Olegovich Nedorezov (born 27 June 1981) is a Russian former professional footballer.

Club career
He made his debut in the Russian Premier League in 2000 for FC Zenit St. Petersburg, and played seven games for them in the 2000 UEFA Intertoto Cup.

Honours
 Russian Premier League runner-up: 2003.
 Russian Premier League bronze: 2001.

References

1981 births
Sportspeople from Pskov
Living people
Russian footballers
Association football defenders
FC Zenit Saint Petersburg players
FC Luch Vladivostok players
FC Metallurg Lipetsk players
FC Volgar Astrakhan players
FC SKA-Khabarovsk players
FC Novokuznetsk players
Russian Premier League players